Hermsdorf is a district (Ortsteil) of Berlin located in the  borough (Bezirk) of Reinickendorf.

History
First mentioned in 1200, it was an autonomous municipality merged into Berlin in 1920 with the "Greater Berlin Act". During the Cold War, as part of West Berlin bordering  East Germany, it was crossed by the Berlin Wall from 1961 to 1989 at its border with the municipality of Glienicke/Nordbahn.

Geography
It is situated in the north of the city, bordering the Brandenburger municipality of Glienicke/Nordbahn (Oberhavel district). It borders the Berliner localities of Frohnau, Tegel, Waidmannslust and Lübars. It also borders the forest of Tegel and part of its territory is included in Barnim Nature Park.

Transport
Hermsdorf is served by the Berlin S-Bahn line S1 at the station Berlin-Hermsdorf.

Personalities
Max Beckmann
Hans Blüher
Erich Kästner
Gustav Landauer
Annemarie Wolff-Richter
Teomponk Simorangkir

References

Literature
 Hans J Arnold: "Als in Hermsdorf noch die Semnonen wohnten". 
 "Festschrift 650 Jahre Hermsdorf. 1349–1999". 
 "Ich denke oft an Onkel Franz. Jüdische Spurensuche in Berlin-Reinickendorf". Bd. 2.: Hermsdorf und Umgebung.

External links

 Hermsdorf page of Reinickendorfer website
 Hermsdorf on Kulturgeschichte Reinickendorf Wiki

Localities of Berlin